Events from the year 1995 in Taiwan, Republic of China. This year is numbered Minguo 84 according to the official Republic of China calendar.

Incumbents
 President – Lee Teng-hui
 Vice President – Li Yuan-tsu
 Premier – Lien Chan
 Vice Premier – Hsu Li-teh

Events

February
 14 February – The launch of KISS Radio.
 15 February – The Weierkang Club fire killed 64, and injured 11 people
 28 February – President Lee Teng-hui publicly addressed the public to discuss the February 28 Incident, the first statement made by the ROC head of state about the incident since 1947.

March
 1 March – The establishment of National Fire Agency of the Ministry of the Interior.
 28 March – The start of Muzha Refuse Incineration Plant commercial operation in Wenshan District, Taipei.

April
 9 April
 The opening of Sanyi Wood Sculpture Museum in Sanyi Township, Miaoli County.
 The opening of Li Mei-shu Memorial Gallery in Sanxia Township, Taipei County.

June
 29 June – The establishment of Children Are Us Foundation.

July
 1 July – The establishment of National Kaohsiung Hospitality Management Academy in Siaogang District, Kaohsiung City.
 20 July – The establishment of Public Construction Commission.
 21 July – The start of Third Taiwan Strait Crisis.

October
 18 October – The establishment of Kinmen National Park in Kinmen County.
 30 October – The establishment of Architecture and Building Research Institute of the Ministry of the Interior.

December
 2 December – The 1995 Republic of China legislative election.
 20 December – The renaming of Central Police College to Central Police University.

Birth
 7 January – Fan Jung-yuv, badminton player
 15 January – Darren Chen, actor
 22 June – Chen Chao-an, football player
 21 November – Liu Sheng-yi, football player

References

 
Years of the 20th century in Taiwan